Ella Fitzgerald Sings the Harold Arlen Song Book is a 1961 (see 1961 in music) album by the American jazz singer Ella Fitzgerald, with a studio orchestra conducted and arranged by Billy May. This album marked the only time that Fitzgerald worked with May.

The Harold Arlen Song Book is the sixth album in Fitzgerald's series of recordings of songs written by the pantheon of Broadway composers who formed the body of work now considered the Great American Songbook.

The cover art is a drawing by Henri Matisse.

Track listing
For the 2-LP set originally released on the Verve label in 1961: Verve MG V-4046-2

Side One:
 "Blues in the Night" (Johnny Mercer) – 7:14
 "Let's Fall in Love" (Ted Koehler) – 4:05
 "Stormy Weather" (Koehler) – 5:17
 "Between the Devil and the Deep Blue Sea" (Koehler) – 2:26
 "My Shining Hour" (Mercer) – 4:02
 "Hooray for Love" (Leo Robin) – 2:45
Side Two:
 "This Time the Dream's on Me" (Mercer) – 4:39
 "That Old Black Magic" (Mercer) – 4:13
 "I've Got the World on a String" (Koehler) – 4:54
 "Let's Take a Walk Around the Block" (Ira Gershwin, E.Y. Harburg) – 4:03
 "Ill Wind" (Koehler) – 3:55
 "Ac-Cent-Tchu-Ate the Positive" (Mercer) – 3:37
Side Three:
 "When the Sun Comes Out" (Koehler) – 5:10
 "Come Rain or Come Shine" (Mercer) – 3:24
 "As Long as I Live" (Koehler) – 3:48
 "Happiness Is a Thing Called Joe" (Harburg) – 3:30
 "It's Only a Paper Moon" (Harburg, Billy Rose) – 3:37
 "The Man That Got Away" (Gershwin) – 5:21
Side Four:
 "One for My Baby (and One More for the Road)" (Mercer) – 3:58
 "It Was Written in the Stars" (Robin) – 5:11
 "Get Happy" (Koehler) – 3:33
 "I Gotta Right to Sing the Blues" (Koehler) – 5:12
 "Out of This World" (Mercer) – 2:46
 "Over the Rainbow" (Harburg) – 4:21

First 2CD re-issue in 1988 added two previously unreleased bonus tracks; Both were included on the 2001 re-issue.
Disc One:

4. "Ding-Dong! The Witch Is Dead" (Harburg) – 3:19

Disc Two:

12. "Sing My Heart" (Koehler) – 2:49

Bonus tracks issued on the 2001 Verve 2CD Reissue, 589108.

27. "Let's Take a Walk Around the Block" (Alternative take) – 4:07

28.  "Sing My Heart" (Alternative take) – 2:32

All songs composed by Harold Arlen, with lyricists indicated.

Personnel 
Recorded in five sessions from August 1, 1960 – July 14, 1961 in Hollywood, Los Angeles.

 Ella Fitzgerald – Vocals
 Billy May – Arranger, conductor
 Orchestra
 Trumpet – Don Fagerquist, Frank Beach, Conrad Gozzo, Joseph Tiscari
 Trombone – Milt Bernhart Edward Kusby, Richard Noel
 Bass trombone – George Roberts
 Alto saxophone – Benny Carter
 Tenor saxophone – Plas Johnson
 Woodwind, flute – Harry Klee, Justin Gordon, Wilbur Schwartz
 Vibraphone – Emil Richards
 Piano – Paul Smith
 Guitar – John Collins
 Double bass – Joe Mondragon
 Drums – Alvin Stoller
 String section
 Violin – Israel Baker, Victor Arno, Victor Bay, Alex Beller, Dan Lube, Erno Neufeld, Lou Raderman, Nathan Ross, Sidney Sharp, Gerald Vinci
 Viola – Alex Neimann, Paul Robyn, Barbara Simons
 Cello – Armand Kaproff, Ray Kramer Eleanor Slatkin
 Norman Granz – Production
 Val Valentin – Engineer

References 

1961 albums
Ella Fitzgerald albums
Verve Records albums
Albums produced by Norman Granz
Albums arranged by Billy May
Albums conducted by Billy May
Covers albums